The 1996 Australian motorcycle Grand Prix was the last round of the 1996 Grand Prix motorcycle racing season. It took place on 20 October 1996 at Eastern Creek Raceway.

500 cc classification

250 cc classification

125 cc classification

References

Australian motorcycle Grand Prix
Australian
Motorcycle
Motorsport at Eastern Creek Raceway